Sesleria argentea is a species of perennial grass in the family Poaceae.

References

argentea